Serhiy Vladyslavovych Proskurnia (28 November 1957 – 1 February 2021) was a Ukrainian stage director.

Biography
Proskurnia's parents were Vladyslav Andriyovych Proskurnia and Emilia Oleksandrivna Proskurnia, both engineers. He then created a radio studio for his school and would regularly visit Moscow and Leningrad to observe theatrical and musical life.

In 1979, Proskurnia met Elena Kamburova, and began organizing her Kyiv concerts two years later. From 1985 to 1987, he was an intern at the Ivan Franko National Academic Drama Theater, sponsored by the Soviet Ministry of Culture. In 1990, he participated in the Revolution on Granite, attempting to free Ukraine from communism. In 1993, he co-founded the Dzyga Art Center. Throughout the 1990s, he collaborated with the International Renaissance Foundation and repeatedly met with its founder, George Soros.

In the 2000s, he participated in a number of international conferences, such as the International Association of Theatre Critics and Congresses of the International Theater Institute in Athens and Manila. In 2009, he served as General Director of the Odessa Opera and Ballet Theater. In 2013 and 2014, he led a film project titled "", much of which was shot during Euromaidan. He directed an oratorio titled "God is with us". It was dedicated to those who died during Euromaidan and during the War in Donbass.

In 2015, Proskurnia began directing holiday concerts on Independence Day of Ukraine. For these events, he invited conductor Kirill Karabits, but some of his directorial decisions were heavily criticized. His decisions to play Sergei Prokofiev and Pyotr Ilyich Tchaikovsky were denounced. In 2017, he invited Russian opera singer Maria Maksakova Jr., which was criticized by critic .

Serhiy Proskurnia died on 1 February 2021, at the age of 63.

References

1957 births
2021 deaths
Ukrainian theatre directors
Theatre people from Kyiv